Flippen is an unincorporated community in Henry County, Georgia, United States. Flippen is within the postal limits of McDonough and as such, most residents list McDonough as their city.

History
Flippen had its start when the railroad was extended to that point. A post office called Flippen was established in 1884, and remained in operation until 1966. The community was named after one Mr. Flippen, a railroad agent.

Major highways
 Interstate 75
 U.S. Highway 23
 Georgia State Route 42
 Georgia State Route 401
 Georgia State Route 920

Demographics
Flippen is within the postal limits of McDonough, Georgia and as such, most residents list McDonough as their city.

References

Unincorporated communities in Henry County, Georgia
Unincorporated communities in Georgia (U.S. state)